
Gmina Mokrsko is a rural gmina (administrative district) in Wieluń County, Łódź Voivodeship, in central Poland.

Villages
Gmina Mokrsko contains the villages and settlements of Brzeziny, Chotów, Jasna Góra, Jeziorko, Komorniki, Krzyworzeka, Lipie, Mątewki, Mokrsko, Mokrsko-Osiedle, Motyl, Orzechowiec, Ożarów, Poręby, Słupsko, Stanisławów and Zmyślona.

Neighbouring gminas
Gmina Mokrsko is bordered by the gminas of Pątnów, Praszka, Skomlin and Wieluń.

References
Polish official population figures 2006

Mokrsko
Wieluń County